Lamine Senghor (born 15 September 1889 in Joal, Senegal and died 25 November 1927 in Fréjus, France) was a Senegalese political activist, Senegalese nationalist, and member of the French Communist Party.
He ran candidate in the Paris local elections in 1924. Nonetheless he remained committed to an independent Senegal and became part of the internationalised struggle against colonialism and imperialism. In 1927, shortly before his death he was invited to attend the congress of oppressed nationalities in Brussels in Belgium where the League against Imperialism was established. The meeting was significant because it brought together representatives and organizations from the communist world and anti-colonial organizations and activists from the colonized world. In his speech he denounced the crimes committed by the colonial administration in Congo, concluding that:

"Imperialist exploitation has as result the gradual extinction of African races. Their culture is going to be lost... For us, the anti-imperialist struggle is identical as anti-capitalist struggle."

Works
 Lamine Senghor: La Violation d´un Pays, Paris 1927.

References

Senegalese activists
1889 births
1927 deaths
Migrants from French Senegal to France